Spearfisherman was a company that made dry suits and fins. Located in Huntington Beach, California, Arthur Brown started it in or before 1945 and sold it to Swimaster in about 1955, which, in turn, was sold to the Voit Rubber Company in the early 1960s.

Swimaster was one of the five original United States diving equipment manufacturers: U.S. Divers, Healthways, Voit, Dacor, and Swimaster.

External links 
 The Spearfisherman Frogman Suits — reproduction of a 1951 print advertisement in The Skin Diver for Spearfisherman Frogman Suits. Retrieved on 25 April 2019.
 Vintage Scuba Supply Community Forum — discussion thread of early diving gear companies. Retrieved on 25 April 2019.

Defunct companies based in California
Diving engineering
Diving equipment manufacturers